Dewoin may be,

Dewoin language
Dewoin District
both in Liberia.